The June Boötids are a meteor shower occurring roughly between 22 June and 2 July each year.  In most years their activity is weak, with a zenith hourly rate (ZHR) of only 1 or 2.  However, occasional outbursts have been seen, with the outburst of 1916 drawing attention to the previously unrecorded meteor shower.  The most recent outburst occurred in 1998, when the ZHR reached up to 100.  The meteor shower occurs when the Earth crosses the orbit of Comet Pons-Winnecke, a short-period comet which orbits the Sun once every 6.37 years.
They can be very unpredictable. They are also considered very slow meteors, as there are much faster ones. They peak on June 27.

External links

 http://meteorshowersonline.com/showers/june_bootids.html
 http://spaceweather.com/meteors/junebootids.html

Meteor showers
June events
July events